Stupina may refer to several villages in Romania:

 Stupina, a village in Crucea Commune, Constanța County
 Stupina, a village in Cârlogani Commune, Olt County
 Stupina, a village in Măicănești Commune, Vrancea County